Witchi-Tai-To is an album by the Jan Garbarek-Bobo Stenson Quartet released on the ECM label and performed by Garbarek, Stenson, Palle Danielsson, and Jon Christensen.

Reception
The Allmusic review by Brian Olewnick awards the album 4½ stars and states, "Long before he became the standard-bearer for the 'ECM sound,' churning out discs with a mildly medieval or Scandinavian flavor spiced with enough new age fluff to guarantee sales, Jan Garbarek produced a string of superb albums, culminating in Witchi-Tai-To, his masterpiece... He might never have reached similar heights since, but Witchi-Tai-To, along with Dave Holland's Conference of the Birds, is one of the two finest jazz albums that ECM ever released, and simply one of the very top jazz albums of the '70s".

Track listing
 "A.I.R." (Carla Bley) – 8:15  
 "Kukka" (Palle Danielsson) – 4:32  
 "Hasta Siempre" (Carlos Puebla) – 8:10  
 "Witchi-Tai-To" (Jim Pepper) – 4:24  
 "Desireless" (Don Cherry) – 20:25

Personnel
Jan Garbarek – tenor saxophone, soprano saxophone
Bobo Stenson – piano
Palle Danielsson – bass
Jon Christensen – drums

References

1974 albums
Jan Garbarek albums
Bobo Stenson albums
ECM Records albums
Albums produced by Manfred Eicher